Michael Luschan (born: 17 September 1965, in Salzburg) is a sailor from Austria, who represented his country at the 1992 Summer Olympics in Barcelona, Spain as helmsman in the Soling. With crew members Georg Stadler and Stefan Lindner they took the 19th place.

References

1965 births
Living people
Austrian male sailors (sport)
Sailors at the 1992 Summer Olympics – Soling
Olympic sailors of Austria
Sportspeople from Salzburg